Doris Thompson (7 July 1909 – 15 September 1983) was an Australian swimmer. She competed in the women's 200 metre breaststroke event at the 1928 Summer Olympics.

References

External links
 

1909 births
1983 deaths
Olympic swimmers of Australia
Swimmers at the 1928 Summer Olympics
Place of birth missing
Australian female breaststroke swimmers
20th-century Australian women